Ciuda Mar is a small neighbourhood in the outskirts of Havana, Cuba.

Overview
Populated after the 60's, this neighborhood is known for its residential aspect, making the difference with other zones of the area. Spite of the buildings, located in the late 80s, this number of streets are still quiet.

Geography of Havana
Tourist attractions in Havana